Stara Sušica is a village southwest of Pivka in the Inner Carniola region of Slovenia.

History
In 1994, territory from Nadanje Selo, Mala Pristava, Nova Sušica, and Stara Sušica was combined to create Ribnica as a separate settlement.

Church
The local church in the settlement is dedicated to John the Baptist and belongs to the Parish of Košana.

References

External links
Stara Sušica on Geopedia

Populated places in the Municipality of Pivka